A vacuum arc thruster (VAT) is a form of electric spacecraft propulsion. It uses a vacuum arc discharge, across an insulator, between two electrodes to produce thrust. A metal plasma is produced from micrometer-size cathodic spots. Thus, whereas the insulator is used as propellant in a pulsed plasma thruster, in a VAT the metallic cathode is consumed as propellant.

See also
 Pulsed plasma thruster
 Vacuum arc

References

External links

 
 

Ion engines